Lechenaultia formosa, commonly known as red leschenaultia, is a species of flowering plant in the family Goodeniaceae and is endemic to the south-west of Western Australia. It is a prostrate or erect shrub or subshrub with crowded, narrow, fleshy leaves and scarlet or orange-red to pale orange flowers.

Description
Flowering mainly occurs in winter and spring but flowers are often present in other months.

Taxonomy
Lechenaultia formosa was first formally described in 1810 by Robert Brown in his Prodromus Florae Novae Hollandiae et Insulae Van Diemen. The specific epithet (formosa) means "beautifully formed".

Distribution and habitat
Red leschenaultia grows in heath, scrub, mallee and woodland and is found across a wide swathe of Western Australia, from the Geraldton sandplains south through to the southwestern corner of the state and east along the southern coast.  It grows on granite-, laterite- or clay soils, where it is found on hills, and in flat areas and gullies.

Use in horticulture
Renowned for its bright red, orange or yellow flowers, Lechenaultia formosa is widely cultivated in Australian gardens. It was first grown in the United Kingdom in 1824. Many cultivars were sold in the 1960s that are no longer available. It grows best in well-ventilated locations with very good drainage; otherwise it is prone to fungal disease, in particular grey mould (Botrytis cinerea) of the branches and soil-borne Phytophthora and Pythium, and is often short-lived. It is propagated readily from cuttings of semi-hardened wood.

Lechenaultia formosa can be grown in hanging baskets or rockeries.

Conservation status
This leschenaultia is listed as "not threatened" by the Government of Western Australia Department of Biodiversity, Conservation and Attractions.

References

External links
 
Lechenaultia formosa occurrence data from Australasian Virtual Herbarium

formosa
Plants described in 1810
Flora of Western Australia
Garden plants of Australia
Taxa named by Robert Brown (botanist, born 1773)